Galileo Magnet High School, opened in September 2002, is a public high school located in Danville, Virginia. The school was originally funded by an 8 million dollar grant to the Danville Public School System.  By working directly with organizations like NASA at Langley Research Center and Virginia Tech, Galileo offers a technology-based curriculum, with three strands of study for students to choose from.  A thematic-based curriculum is provided in Advanced Communications and Networking Technology, Air and Space Technology, and Biotechnology.  
U.S. News & World Report ranked the school the 45th best in the state in 2020.

Galileo is an International Baccalaureate world school.

Athletics
Galileo features two sports – a varsity soccer and cross-country team in the Dogwood District.

References

External links
Galileo Magnet High School Website
Galileo Magnet High School Official Handbook (2011–2012)

Public high schools in Virginia
Magnet schools in Virginia
Educational institutions established in 2002
International Baccalaureate schools in Virginia
2002 establishments in Virginia
Schools in Danville, Virginia